Chris Clark (born March 8, 1976) is an American former professional ice hockey right winger who played in the National Hockey League (NHL) for the Calgary Flames, Washington Capitals and Columbus Blue Jackets.

In 2019, he was named the general manager of the American Hockey League's Cleveland Monsters.

Playing career

College
Clark played four years for the Clarkson Golden Knights in the ECAC (NCAA Division I), recording 128 points (63 goals and 65 assists) and 392 penalty minutes in 142 games. He was named to the ECAC Second All-Star team in 1998.

Professional
Clark was drafted in the third round, 77th overall, by the Calgary Flames in the 1994 NHL Entry Draft. He played five seasons with the Flames. In his final season with the team, he played in every game and helped the team to the 2004 Stanley Cup Finals, which they lost to the Tampa Bay Lightning.

Clark was traded to the Washington Capitals as a restricted free agent on August 4, 2005, in exchange for a conditional pick in the 2006 Entry Draft. He scored 20 goals and 19 assists (39 points) with the Capitals in his first season, playing alongside rookie Alexander Ovechkin. The Capitals named Clark their new team captain on September 13, 2006. Clark then set career-high numbers in goals (30), assists (24) and points (54) during the 2006–07 season, continuing to play alongside Ovechkin.

Clark was injured in the third period of a 2–1 shootout loss to the Florida Panthers on November 28, 2007, and missed the next 18 games with a strained groin muscle. He returned to the lineup on February 13, 2008, but played only one shift against the Philadelphia Flyers. Clark kicked out his skate in an attempt to stop a pass when he aggravated the groin injury. Clark missed the remainder of the regular season and playoffs.

After suffering a wrist injury in February 2009, Clark required surgery which ended his 2008–09 season. He skated with the team during the pre-game skate before Game 5 of the 2009 Stanley Cup playoff game against the New York Rangers, but did not return until Game 7, taking the place of Donald Brashear, who was suspended for six games after his late hit on New York's Blair Betts.

On December 28, 2009, Clark (along with defenseman Milan Jurčina) was traded to the Columbus Blue Jackets in exchange for winger Jason Chimera. Clark was the third-longest tenured captain in the history of the Washington Capitals, behind only Hockey Hall of Famer Rod Langway and Dale Hunter.

During the 2011 off-season, Clark accepted a try-out invitation from the Boston Bruins. Despite having an impressive pre-season, he was released from the Bruins training camp on October 5, 2011, without a contract. On November 3, 2011, Clark signed a professional tryout agreement with the Providence Bruins, the American Hockey League (AHL) affiliate of the Boston Bruins. He was released by Providence on November 21, 2011, after six games, failing to record a point during his tryout period.

Retirement
After he was released by Providence, Clark took up a scouting position with the Columbus Blue Jackets organization for the remainder of the 2011–12 season before being named the team's development coach. In 2019, the Blue Jackets named him the general manager of their American Hockey League affiliate, the Cleveland Monsters.

International play
During the 2004–05 NHL lockout Clark continued his career in Europe. Clark first played through a short stint with Swiss team SC Bern, then with Norwegian outfit Storhamar Dragons.

In 2007, Clark was chosen as the captain of the United States national team for the 2007 IIHF World Championship, where he scored two goals and one assist in six games.

Career statistics

Regular season and playoffs

International

Awards and honors

References

External links

 
 
 

1976 births
Living people
American expatriate sportspeople in Norway
American men's ice hockey right wingers
Calgary Flames draft picks
Calgary Flames players
Clarkson Golden Knights men's ice hockey players
Columbus Blue Jackets coaches
Columbus Blue Jackets players
Columbus Blue Jackets scouts
Ice hockey players from Connecticut
People from South Windsor, Connecticut
Providence Bruins players
SC Bern players
Storhamar Dragons players
Washington Capitals captains
Washington Capitals players